Bradley "Brad" Hauser (born March 28, 1977) is a retired American long-distance runner.

He finished fourteenth at the 1996 World Junior Championships and 21st at the 1999 World Championships , both in the 10,000 metres; and also finished fifteenth in the short race at the 2001 World Cross Country Championships. He also competed in the 5000 metres at the 2000 Summer Olympics without reaching the final.

His personal best times were 7:51.20 minutes in the 3000 metres, achieved in February 2001 in Boston (indoor); 13:27.31 minutes in the 5000 metres, achieved in July 2000 in Sacramento; 27:58.02 minutes in the 10,000 metres, achieved in May 2002 in Palo Alto; and 2:14:15 hours in the marathon, achieved in September 2002 in Minneapolis.

Hauser was born in Danville, Pennsylvania.

References

1977 births
Living people
American male long-distance runners
Olympic track and field athletes of the United States
Stanford Cardinal men's track and field athletes
Athletes (track and field) at the 2000 Summer Olympics
World Athletics Championships athletes for the United States
People from Danville, Pennsylvania
Stanford Cardinal men's cross country runners
20th-century American people